Volkovo is the name of several rural localities in Russia.

Modern localities

Amur Oblast
As of 2012, one rural locality in Amur Oblast bears this name:
Volkovo, Amur Oblast, a selo in Volkovsky Rural Settlement of Blagoveshchensky District

Arkhangelsk Oblast
As of 2012, one rural locality in Arkhangelsk Oblast bears this name:
Volkovo, Arkhangelsk Oblast, a village in Ukhtostrovsky Selsoviet of Kholmogorsky District

Republic of Bashkortostan
As of 2012, four rural localities in the Republic of Bashkortostan bear this name:
Volkovo, Aurgazinsky District, Republic of Bashkortostan, a village in Tukayevsky Selsoviet of Aurgazinsky District
Volkovo, Blagoveshchensky District, Republic of Bashkortostan, a selo in Volkovsky Selsoviet of Blagoveshchensky District
Volkovo, Cherkassky Selsoviet, Ufimsky District, Republic of Bashkortostan, a village in Cherkassky Selsoviet of Ufimsky District
Volkovo, Dmitriyevsky Selsoviet, Ufimsky District, Republic of Bashkortostan, a village in Dmitriyevsky Selsoviet of Ufimsky District

Belgorod Oblast
As of 2012, one rural locality in Belgorod Oblast bears this name:
Volkovo, Belgorod Oblast, a selo in Chernyansky District

Chelyabinsk Oblast
As of 2012, one rural locality in Chelyabinsk Oblast bears this name:
Volkovo, Chelyabinsk Oblast, a settlement under the administrative jurisdiction of the Town of Minyar in Ashinsky District

Ivanovo Oblast
As of 2012, three rural localities in Ivanovo Oblast bear this name:
Volkovo, Lezhnevsky District, Ivanovo Oblast, a village in Lezhnevsky District
Volkovo, Pestyakovsky District, Ivanovo Oblast, a village in Pestyakovsky District
Volkovo, Vichugsky District, Ivanovo Oblast, a village in Vichugsky District

Kaluga Oblast
As of 2012, two rural localities in Kaluga Oblast bear this name:
Volkovo, Babyninsky District, Kaluga Oblast, a selo in Babyninsky District
Volkovo, Sukhinichsky District, Kaluga Oblast, a selo in Sukhinichsky District

Kirov Oblast
As of 2012, two rural localities in Kirov Oblast bear this name:
Volkovo, Slobodskoy District, Kirov Oblast, a selo in Leninsky Rural Okrug of Slobodskoy District; 
Volkovo, Yaransky District, Kirov Oblast, a village in Shkalansky Rural Okrug of Yaransky District;

Kostroma Oblast
As of 2012, nine rural localities in Kostroma Oblast bear this name:
Volkovo, Antropovsky District, Kostroma Oblast, a village in Prosekskoye Settlement of Antropovsky District; 
Volkovo, Chukhlomsky District, Kostroma Oblast, a village in Petrovskoye Settlement of Chukhlomsky District; 
Volkovo, Galichsky District, Kostroma Oblast, a village in Dmitriyevskoye Settlement of Galichsky District; 
Volkovo, Neysky District, Kostroma Oblast, a village in Soltanovskoye Settlement of Neysky District; 
Volkovo, Oktyabrsky District, Kostroma Oblast, a village in Pokrovskoye Settlement of Oktyabrsky District; 
Volkovo, Burdukovskoye Settlement, Soligalichsky District, Kostroma Oblast, a village in Burdukovskoye Settlement of Soligalichsky District; 
Volkovo, Pervomayskoye Settlement, Soligalichsky District, Kostroma Oblast, a village in Pervomayskoye Settlement of Soligalichsky District; 
Volkovo, Andreyevskoye Settlement, Susaninsky District, Kostroma Oblast, a village in Andreyevskoye Settlement of Susaninsky District; 
Volkovo, Chentsovskoye Settlement, Susaninsky District, Kostroma Oblast, a village in Chentsovskoye Settlement of Susaninsky District;

Kursk Oblast
As of 2012, two rural localities in Kursk Oblast bear this name:
Volkovo, Konyshyovsky District, Kursk Oblast, a selo in Ryzhkovsky Selsoviet of Konyshyovsky District
Volkovo, Zheleznogorsky District, Kursk Oblast, a selo in Volkovsky Selsoviet of Zheleznogorsky District

Leningrad Oblast
As of 2012, one rural locality in Leningrad Oblast bears this name:
Volkovo, Leningrad Oblast, a village in Kuzemkinskoye Settlement Municipal Formation of Kingiseppsky District;

Lipetsk Oblast
As of 2012, one rural locality in Lipetsk Oblast bears this name:
Volkovo, Lipetsk Oblast, a village in Vednovsky Selsoviet of Chaplyginsky District;

Moscow Oblast
As of 2012, nine rural localities in Moscow Oblast bear this name:
Volkovo, Lotoshinsky District, Moscow Oblast, a village in Mikulinskoye Rural Settlement of Lotoshinsky District; 
Volkovo, Naro-Fominsky District, Moscow Oblast, a village under the administrative jurisdiction of the Town of Vereya in Naro-Fominsky District; 
Volkovo, Odintsovsky District, Moscow Oblast, a village in Nikolskoye Rural Settlement of Odintsovsky District; 
Volkovo, Ruzsky District, Moscow Oblast, a village in Volkovskoye Rural Settlement of Ruzsky District; 
Volkovo, Serpukhovsky District, Moscow Oblast, a village in Lipitskoye Rural Settlement of Serpukhovsky District; 
Volkovo, Stupinsky District, Moscow Oblast, a village in Leontyevskoye Rural Settlement of Stupinsky District; 
Volkovo, Guslevskoye Rural Settlement, Taldomsky District, Moscow Oblast, a village in Guslevskoye Rural Settlement of Taldomsky District; 
Volkovo, Kvashenkovskoye Rural Settlement, Taldomsky District, Moscow Oblast, a village in Kvashenkovskoye Rural Settlement of Taldomsky District; 
Volkovo, Yegoryevsky District, Moscow Oblast, a village in Ramenskoye Rural Settlement of Yegoryevsky District;

Nizhny Novgorod Oblast
As of 2012, five rural localities in Nizhny Novgorod Oblast bear this name:
Volkovo, Chkalovsky District, Nizhny Novgorod Oblast, a village in Kotelnitsky Selsoviet of Chkalovsky District
Volkovo, Koverninsky District, Nizhny Novgorod Oblast, a village in Gavrilovsky Selsoviet of Koverninsky District
Volkovo, Sokolsky District, Nizhny Novgorod Oblast, a village in Mezhdurechensky Selsoviet of Sokolsky District
Volkovo, Tonkinsky District, Nizhny Novgorod Oblast, a village in Berdnikovsky Selsoviet of Tonkinsky District
Volkovo, Vetluzhsky District, Nizhny Novgorod Oblast, a village in Moshkinsky Selsoviet of Vetluzhsky District

Oryol Oblast
As of 2012, two rural localities in Oryol Oblast bear this name:
Volkovo, Mtsensky District, Oryol Oblast, a village in Podmokrinsky Selsoviet of Mtsensky District
Volkovo, Shablykinsky District, Oryol Oblast, a village in Titovsky Selsoviet of Shablykinsky District

Perm Krai
As of 2012, one rural locality in Perm Krai bears this name:
Volkovo, Perm Krai, a village in Kishertsky District

Pskov Oblast
As of 2012, twenty rural localities in Pskov Oblast bear this name:
Volkovo, Krasnogorodsky District, Pskov Oblast, a village in Krasnogorodsky District
Volkovo, Kunyinsky District, Pskov Oblast, a village in Kunyinsky District
Volkovo, Loknyansky District, Pskov Oblast, a village in Loknyansky District
Volkovo, Novosokolnichesky District, Pskov Oblast, a village in Novosokolnichesky District
Volkovo (Prigorodnaya Rural Settlement), Opochetsky District, Pskov Oblast, a village in Opochetsky District; municipally, a part of Prigorodnaya Rural Settlement of that district
Volkovo (Varyginskaya Rural Settlement), Opochetsky District, Pskov Oblast, a village in Opochetsky District; municipally, a part of Varyginskaya Rural Settlement of that district
Volkovo (Bolgatovskaya Rural Settlement), Opochetsky District, Pskov Oblast, a village in Opochetsky District; municipally, a part of Bolgatovskaya Rural Settlement of that district
Volkovo (Zvonskaya Rural Settlement), Opochetsky District, Pskov Oblast, a village in Opochetsky District; municipally, a part of Zvonskaya Rural Settlement of that district
Volkovo, Ostrovsky District, Pskov Oblast, a village in Ostrovsky District
Volkovo (Cherskaya Rural Settlement), Palkinsky District, Pskov Oblast, a village in Palkinsky District; municipally, a part of Cherskaya Rural Settlement of that district
Volkovo (Kachanovskaya Rural Settlement), Palkinsky District, Pskov Oblast, a village in Palkinsky District; municipally, a part of Kachanovskaya Rural Settlement of that district
Volkovo, Pechorsky District, Pskov Oblast, a village in Pechorsky District
Volkovo, Plyussky District, Pskov Oblast, a village in Plyussky District
Volkovo (Karamyshevskaya Rural Settlement), Pskovsky District, Pskov Oblast, a village in Pskovsky District; municipally, a part of Karamyshevskaya Rural Settlement of that district
Volkovo (Tyamshanskaya Rural Settlement), Pskovsky District, Pskov Oblast, a village in Pskovsky District; municipally, a part of Tyamshanskaya Rural Settlement of that district
Volkovo, Pushkinogorsky District, Pskov Oblast, a village in Pushkinogorsky District
Volkovo, Pustoshkinsky District, Pskov Oblast, a village in Pustoshkinsky District
Volkovo, Pytalovsky District, Pskov Oblast, a village in Pytalovsky District
Volkovo (Lychevskaya Rural Settlement), Velikoluksky District, Pskov Oblast, a village in Velikoluksky District; municipally, a part of Lychevskaya Rural Settlement of that district
Volkovo (Maryinskaya Rural Settlement), Velikoluksky District, Pskov Oblast, a village in Velikoluksky District; municipally, a part of Maryinskaya Rural Settlement of that district

Ryazan Oblast
As of 2012, two rural localities in Ryazan Oblast bear this name:
Volkovo, Kasimovsky District, Ryazan Oblast, a village in Ovchinnikovsky Rural Okrug of Kasimovsky District
Volkovo, Ryazhsky District, Ryazan Oblast, a village in Marchukovsky 2 Rural Okrug of Ryazhsky District

Saratov Oblast
As of 2012, one rural locality in Saratov Oblast bears this name:
Volkovo, Saratov Oblast, a selo in Marksovsky District

Smolensk Oblast
As of 2012, six rural localities in Smolensk Oblast bear this name:
Volkovo, Dorogobuzhsky District, Smolensk Oblast, a village in Usvyatskoye Rural Settlement of Dorogobuzhsky District
Volkovo, Dukhovshchinsky District, Smolensk Oblast, a village in Beresnevskoye Rural Settlement of Dukhovshchinsky District
Volkovo, Krasninsky District, Smolensk Oblast, a village in Volkovskoye Rural Settlement of Krasninsky District
Volkovo, Monastyrshchinsky District, Smolensk Oblast, a village in Sobolevskoye Rural Settlement of Monastyrshchinsky District
Volkovo, Rudnyansky District, Smolensk Oblast, a village in Lyubavichskoye Rural Settlement of Rudnyansky District
Volkovo, Yelninsky District, Smolensk Oblast, a village in Bobrovichskoye Rural Settlement of Yelninsky District

Sverdlovsk Oblast
As of 2012, two rural localities in Sverdlovsk Oblast bear this name:
Volkovo, Artinsky District, Sverdlovsk Oblast, a village in Pristaninsky Selsoviet of Artinsky District
Volkovo, Irbitsky District, Sverdlovsk Oblast, a selo in Berdyuginsky Selsoviet of Irbitsky District

Tambov Oblast
As of 2012, one rural locality in Tambov Oblast bears this name:
Volkovo, Tambov Oblast, a village in Karaulsky Selsoviet of Inzhavinsky District

Republic of Tatarstan
As of 2012, one rural locality in the Republic of Tatarstan bears this name:
Volkovo, Republic of Tatarstan, a selo in Agryzsky District

Tomsk Oblast
As of 2012, one rural locality in Tomsk Oblast bears this name:
Volkovo, Tomsk Oblast, a village in Kolpashevsky District

Tula Oblast
As of 2012, two rural localities in Tula Oblast bear this name:
Volkovo, Leninsky District, Tula Oblast, a village in Aleshinsky Rural Okrug of Leninsky District
Volkovo, Uzlovsky District, Tula Oblast, a village in Lyutoricheskaya Rural Administration of Uzlovsky District

Tver Oblast
As of 2012, fourteen rural localities in Tver Oblast bear this name:
Volkovo, Bezhetsky District, Tver Oblast, a village in Vasyukovskoye Rural Settlement of Bezhetsky District
Volkovo, Bologovsky District, Tver Oblast, a village in Berezayskoye Rural Settlement of Bologovsky District
Volkovo, Kashinsky District, Tver Oblast, a village in Davydovskoye Rural Settlement of Kashinsky District
Volkovo, Molokovsky District, Tver Oblast, a village in Obrosovskoye Rural Settlement of Molokovsky District
Volkovo, Glazkovskoye Rural Settlement, Oleninsky District, Tver Oblast, a village in Glazkovskoye Rural Settlement of Oleninsky District
Volkovo, Gusevskoye Rural Settlement, Oleninsky District, Tver Oblast, a village in Gusevskoye Rural Settlement of Oleninsky District
Volkovo, Kholmetskoye Rural Settlement, Oleninsky District, Tver Oblast, a village in Kholmetskoye Rural Settlement of Oleninsky District
Volkovo, Molodotudskoye Rural Settlement, Oleninsky District, Tver Oblast, a village in Molodotudskoye Rural Settlement of Oleninsky District
Volkovo, Rameshkovsky District, Tver Oblast, a village in Kushalino Rural Settlement of Rameshkovsky District
Volkovo, Selizharovsky District, Tver Oblast, a village in Okovetskoye Rural Settlement of Selizharovsky District
Volkovo, Stepurinskoye Rural Settlement, Staritsky District, Tver Oblast, a village in Stepurinskoye Rural Settlement of Staritsky District
Volkovo, Stepurinskoye Rural Settlement, Staritsky District, Tver Oblast, a village in Stepurinskoye Rural Settlement of Staritsky District
Volkovo, Vyshnevolotsky District, Tver Oblast, a village in Sorokinskoye Rural Settlement of Vyshnevolotsky District
Volkovo, Zharkovsky District, Tver Oblast, a village in Shchucheyskoye Rural Settlement of Zharkovsky District

Vladimir Oblast
As of 2012, two rural localities in Vladimir Oblast bear this name:
Volkovo, Petushinsky District, Vladimir Oblast, a village in Petushinsky District
Volkovo, Sobinsky District, Vladimir Oblast, a village in Sobinsky District

Volgograd Oblast
As of 2012, one rural locality in Volgograd Oblast bears this name:
Volkovo, Volgograd Oblast, a selo in Dubovsky Selsoviet of Yelansky District

Vologda Oblast
As of 2012, eleven rural localities in Vologda Oblast bear this name:
Volkovo, Babayevsky District, Vologda Oblast, a village in Novolukinsky Selsoviet of Babayevsky District
Volkovo, Belozersky District, Vologda Oblast, a village in Artyushinsky Selsoviet of Belozersky District
Volkovo, Cherepovetsky District, Vologda Oblast, a village in Abakanovsky Selsoviet of Cherepovetsky District
Volkovo, Frolovsky Selsoviet, Gryazovetsky District, Vologda Oblast, a village in Frolovsky Selsoviet of Gryazovetsky District
Volkovo, Pertsevsky Selsoviet, Gryazovetsky District, Vologda Oblast, a village in Pertsevsky Selsoviet of Gryazovetsky District
Volkovo, Kichmengsko-Gorodetsky District, Vologda Oblast, a village in Shongsky Selsoviet of Kichmengsko-Gorodetsky District
Volkovo, Sheksninsky District, Vologda Oblast, a village in Domshinsky Selsoviet of Sheksninsky District
Volkovo, Sokolsky District, Vologda Oblast, a village in Prigorodny Selsoviet of Sokolsky District
Volkovo, Vashkinsky District, Vologda Oblast, a village in Kisnemsky Selsoviet of Vashkinsky District
Volkovo, Podlesny Selsoviet, Vologodsky District, Vologda Oblast, a village in Podlesny Selsoviet of Vologodsky District
Volkovo, Spassky Selsoviet, Vologodsky District, Vologda Oblast, a village in Spassky Selsoviet of Vologodsky District

Yaroslavl Oblast
As of 2012, eight rural localities in Yaroslavl Oblast bear this name:
Volkovo, Bolsheselsky District, Yaroslavl Oblast, a village in Markovsky Rural Okrug of Bolsheselsky District
Volkovo, Breytovsky District, Yaroslavl Oblast, a village in Sutkovsky Rural Okrug of Breytovsky District
Volkovo, Danilovsky District, Yaroslavl Oblast, a village in Babayevsky Rural Okrug of Danilovsky District
Volkovo, Nekouzsky District, Yaroslavl Oblast, a village in Latskovsky Rural Okrug of Nekouzsky District
Volkovo, Makarovsky Rural Okrug, Rybinsky District, Yaroslavl Oblast, a village in Makarovsky Rural Okrug of Rybinsky District
Volkovo, Ogarkovsky Rural Okrug, Rybinsky District, Yaroslavl Oblast, a village in Ogarkovsky Rural Okrug of Rybinsky District
Volkovo, Tutayevsky District, Yaroslavl Oblast, a village in Chebakovsky Rural Okrug of Tutayevsky District
Volkovo, Yaroslavsky District, Yaroslavl Oblast, a village in Teleginsky Rural Okrug of Yaroslavsky District

Renamed localities
Volkovo, name of Yuzhnaya, a village in Russko-Yurmashsky Selsoviet of Ufimsky District in the Republic of Bashkortostan, before March 2008

Alternative names
Volkovo, alternative name of Volkova, a village under the administrative jurisdiction of Karachev Urban Administrative Okrug in Karachevsky District of Bryansk Oblast; 
Volkovo, alternative name of Iki Chonos, a selo in Krasnomikhaylovskaya Rural Administration of Yashaltinsky District in the Republic of Kalmykia;